Merophyas scandalota is a species of moth of the family Tortricidae. It is found in Australia, where it has been recorded from Victoria and the Australian Capital Territory.

The wingspan is 14.5-16.5 mm.

References

	

Moths described in 1910
Archipini